Sauvillers-Mongival is a commune in the Somme department in Hauts-de-France in northern France.

Geography
A rural town mostly given over to agricultural activity, mainly timber, cereals and sugar beet, organised by a farming cooperative. In 1938, there were eleven farms.

Population

History
Mongival was formerly a hamlet, the name coming from the place ruined by the Spaniards during the siege of Corbie in 1636. In 1178, the city was known as Serpentwiler.

Sauvillers-Mongival was first mentioned in the 12th century. The seigneurie was bought in 1393 by the lords of Raineval.

During the First World War, the town was completely flattened, except for three houses. St. Martin's church, rebuilt after 1918, dates back to the 19th century.  
In July 1918, the town was liberated by French troops of the 87th infantry regiment. In 1959, a commemorative plate was fixed to one of the walls of the church tower to recall the sacrifice of these soldiers. A war memorial lists the members of the commune that died during World War I.

In the village cemetery are the graves of five British airmen that were shot down nearby in their Lancaster bomber in 1943.

See also
Communes of the Somme department

References

Communes of Somme (department)